Muncaster is a civil parish in the Borough of Copeland, Cumbria, England.  It contains 14 buildings that are recorded in the National Heritage List for England.  Of these, two are listed at Grade I, the highest of the three grades, one is at Grade II*, the middle grade, and the others are at Grade II, the lowest grade.  The parish contains the coastal village of Ravenglass and countryside to the east.  The most important building in the parish is Muncaster Castle; this and buildings associated with it, including St Michael's Church and associated structures, are listed.  The other listed buildings are houses, farmhouses, farm buildings, and a war memorial.


Key

Buildings

References

Citations

Sources

Lists of listed buildings in Cumbria
Borough of Copeland